Charles of Naples may refer to:

Charles I of Naples
Charles II of Naples
Charles III of Naples
Charles IV of Naples, also king of Spain and Sicily and Holy Roman emperor
Charles V of Naples, also king of Spain and Sicily
Charles VI of Naples, also king of Sicily and Holy Roman emperor
Charles VII of Naples, also king of Spain and Sicily